Leomar de Melo Quintanilha (born October 23, 1945 in Goiânia) is a Brazilian politician.  Formerly a banker with the Banco do Brasil, he served in the Chamber of Deputies representing Tocantins from 1989 until 1995; since 1994 he has represented the state in the Senate of Brazil.  He is a member of the Brazilian Democratic Movement Party. He is the president of the Federação Tocantinense de Futebol since its foundation in 1990.

References
Page at Senate website

1945 births
Living people
Members of the Federal Senate (Brazil)
Members of the Chamber of Deputies (Brazil) from Tocantins
People from Goiânia
Brazilian Democratic Movement politicians